Michel Darluc (1717–1783) was a French naturalist.

1717 births
1783 deaths
French naturalists
People from Provence